Flovilla is a city in Butts County, Georgia, United States. The population was 653 at the 2010 census.

Indian Springs State Park is nearby.

History
Flovilla incorporated in 1885. Flovilla is a coined name meaning "village of flowers".

Geography
U.S. Route 23 passes through the center of the city, leading northwest  to Jackson, the county seat, and southeast  to Macon.

Demographics

As of the census of 2000, there were 652 people, 206 households, and 172 families residing in the city. The racial makeup of the city was 47.85% White, 51.53% African American, 0.15% Native American, and 0.46% from two or more races. Hispanic or Latino of any race were 1.53% of the population.

There were 206 households, out of which 38.3% had children under the age of 18 living with them, 55.8% were married couples living together, 18.0% had a female householder with no husband present, and 16.5% were non-families. 13.1% of all households were made up of individuals, and 4.9% had someone living alone who was 65 years of age or older.  The average household size was 3.17 and the average family size was 3.47.

In the city, the population was spread out, with 29.8% under the age of 18, 11.2% from 18 to 24, 27.0% from 25 to 44, 23.9% from 45 to 64, and 8.1% who were 65 years of age or older.  The median age was 31 years. For every 100 females, there were 95.2 males.  For every 100 females age 18 and over, there were 94.1 males.

The median income for a household in the city was $38,194, and the median income for a family was $42,679. Males had a median income of $26,507 versus $18,750 for females. The per capita income for the city was $15,712.  About 13.0% of families and 12.3% of the population were below the poverty line, including 15.0% of those under age 18 and 20.0% of those age 65 or over.

References

Cities in Georgia (U.S. state)
Cities in Butts County, Georgia